Presidential elections were held in Georgia on 5 November 1995. The result was a victory for Eduard Shevardnadze of the Union of Citizens of Georgia, who won 77.0% of the vote, with a 68.3% turnout.

Results

References

Presidential elections in Georgia (country)
1995 in Georgia (country)
Georgia
Georgia